Statistics of Latvian Higher League in the 1941 season.

Overview
Started in June 1941 but was immediately interrupted when Germany started the war against Soviet Union.

References
RSSSF

Latvian SSR Higher League
1941 in Latvian football
Latvia